Eibar Coa Monteverde (born February 15, 1971, in Venezuela) is a jockey in American Thoroughbred horse racing. 

Coa was born and raised in Venezuela. A five-time judo champion in his teens, he attended jockey school from 1989 to 1991 then began his professional riding career in 1992. He emigrated to the United States in 1993 but went back home.

In 1996, Coa returned to the U.S. to compete at racetracks in Florida, where he became the leading jockey at Calder Race Course in 1996, 1997, 1999, and 2000. In addition, he was the leading jockey at Calder Race Course's Tropical Park meet in 1998 and 1999. On September 7, 1998, he tied a then Calder Race Course record when he rode six winners on a single race card. His success at that track led to his 2004 induction in the Calder Race Course Hall of Fame. 

Eibar Coa was the leading jockey at New Jersey's Monmouth Park in 2002 and at Florida's Gulfstream Park the following year. He also has competed successfully on the New York Racing Association (NYRA) circuit, winning riding championships at Aqueduct Racetrack in 2006 and that year became his breakout year as he was tying for that year's fall jockey title at Belmont Park. On December 29, 2006, he joined Hall of Fame inductees Angel Cordero Jr., Steve Cauthen, and Mike E. Smith as the only jockeys in the history of NYRA to win 300 races in one year. He was voted 2006 Jockey of the Year by the New York Thoroughbred Breeders, Inc.

In 2007, Eibar Coa was ranked seventh among all jockeys in the Eastern United States with total earnings of $4,237,059, and was leading jockey at the Belmont Park fall meet.

Coa was temporarily paralyzed from the neck down and lost part of his lungs after fracturing his C-4 vertebra in a racing accident at Gulfstream Park on February 18, 2011, In spite of being designated a quadriplegic with little hope for recovery, he beat the odds and is now walking on his own and progressing toward what he hopes will be a full recuperation.

References
 Eibar Coa at the NTRA
 About, Inc., A part of The New York Times Company, article on Eibar Coa winning his 300th race on the NYRA circuit

Year-end charts

Venezuelan jockeys
Living people
1971 births